Antônio Carbonari Netto is a Brazilian educator, mathematician, and businessman.

He is founder, CEO and one of the main shareholders of Anhanguera Educacional, a holding of 18 institutions of higher education in the state of São Paulo, one of the largest private universities in the country.

In addition to his position and CEO of Anhangüera Educacional, he is dean of the Centro Universitário Anhangüera of Leme (Anhangüera University Center), and director general of the following colleges: Faculdades de Valinhos, Faculdade Comunitária de Campinas, Faculdade Politécnica de Jundiaí and Faculdade Politécnica de Matão.

Carbonari Netto is a prominent academic and business leader in the private education world in Brazil. He has served in the executive board and councils of several important associations, such as the Associação Brasileira de Mantenedoras do Ensino Superior (Brazilian Association of Higher Education Organizations), Sindicato dos Estabelecimentos do Ensino Superior de São Paulo (Syndicate of the Higher Education Institutions of São Paulo), and others.

In late 2011, massive layoffs took place at all Anhangüera Educacional establishments. Over 1500 lecturers and professors with the highest salaries were dismissed, a move focused exclusively on increasing profits.  Classes hours were also decreased, worsening the educational value from the courses offered.

References

External links
Anhangüera Educacional S.A.
IFC to finance post-secondary education to lower-income students in Brazil

Brazilian educators
Living people
People from Campinas
Brazilian mathematicians
Brazilian businesspeople
Brazilian people of Italian descent
Year of birth missing (living people)